C13orf38 is a protein found in the thirteenth chromosome with an open reading frame number 38. It is 139 amino acids long. The protein goes by a number of aliases CCDC169-SOHLH2 and CCDC169. The protein is found to be over expressed in the testis of humans. It is not known what the exact function of the protein is at this current time. The human CCDC169 gene contains 753 nucleotides. C13orf contains a domain of unknown function DUF4600. which is conserved in between nucleotide interval 1-79. The protein contains 139 amino acids.

Aliases 
Known aliases are CCDC169 and CCDC169-SOHLH2. SOHLH refers to the suspected role in oogenesis and spermatogenesis. CCDC refers to the structure of the domain the protein, which is a coil-coil domain containing protein. Isoforms:
C13orf38 has seven isoforms, a through e. The most common isoform is isoform b. CCDC169 isoform b gene codes for the C13orf38 protein. Isoform b is the most common isoform.

Protein regulation 
There is evidence that the protein is retained in the nucleus. There are several leucine-rich nuclear export signals in the amino acid sequence of the protein. Making it likely to be retained in the nucleus after transcription.

Gene expression

Tissue expression 
C13orf38 is over expressed in the testis of humans. It has very weak expression data in the bone marrow, brain, and vascular tissues. It is expressed in several types of tumors – brain, lung, and germ cell tumors. It can also be expressed in leukemia cells.

Antibodies 
There are antibodies available that are polyclonal. The antibodies come from a rabbit host sold by Bioss antibodies. The molecular weight is 25kDa.

Homologs and paralogs 
Homologs were found mostly in primates. The homolog with the furthest divergence would be the Hood coral, which predates humans by 686 million years.

There are two low identity paralogs and two hypothetical protein paralogs found through the sequencing of the human genome.

Genetic divergence 
Diverges 432 million years ago from Zebra fish. The most divergent species would be the Hood coral, Stylophora pistillata, at 686 million years ago.

Interacting proteins

Experimental data 
Cdcc169 has been used in a variety of tissue expression experiments. One study was done on a variety of tissues in order to show that gene expression in the mid-range of tissue expression can give a strong clue to the function of a gene. The study covered and analyzed set of 62,839 probe sets in 12 representative normal human tissues. 0 represents housekeeping genes and 1 is for tissue specific genes. CCDC 169 was found not to have housekeeping gene type expression. It was tissue specific and appeared in the prostate.

A systematic survey of gene expression in 115 human tissue samples representing 35 different tissue types. The study used cDNA micro-arrays representing approximately 26,000 different human genes. The study included Ccdc169, which showed a strong positive expression in the testes. This study goal was to find a baseline which could be used to help identify diseased tissue and look at genes with tissue specific expression and how those can be used as markers for detecting diseased and injured tissue in organs. Could be used in anticancer therapy.

References

Human proteins